The 2008–09 Ottawa Senators season was the team's 17th season in the National Hockey League (NHL). The team began the season with a new head coach, Craig Hartsburg, and numerous personnel changes after narrowly making the 2008 Stanley Cup playoffs. However, the team had a losing record under the new coach and he was fired in February, replaced by Binghamton Senators' head coach Cory Clouston. The team improved its record under Clouston, but not enough to qualify for the 2009 playoffs, ending an 11-year string of qualifying for the playoffs.

Off-season
It was an off-season of numerous personnel changes. Wade Redden, a long-time Senator, signed a contract as a free agent with the New York Rangers. Ray Emery and Brian McGrattan, considered poor influences in the dressing room, were discarded. The Senators re-signed forwards Shean Donovan, Chris Kelly and Antoine Vermette and made several free agent signings, including Alex Auld, Jarkko Ruutu and Jason Smith. After an extended period of negotiations with Andrej Meszaros failed to produce a contract, the Tampa Bay Lightning showed interest in the defenceman, who was a restricted free agent. Unable to provide the draft picks needed to compensate the Senators, a trade was made and the Senators received Filip Kuba, Alexandre Picard and a first-round pick in the 2009 NHL Entry Draft from Tampa Bay.

Highlights
On June 5, it was reported that Wade Redden would not sign a contract paying $3.5 million annually with the Senators. He instead became an unrestricted free agent (UFA) on July 1 and signed a six-year, $39 million contract with the New York Rangers. On June 13, 2008, the Senators named Craig Hartsburg, coach of the Ontario Hockey League's Sault Ste. Marie Greyhounds, the new head coach after having interviewed candidates Bob Hartley and Peter DeBoer. Hartsburg signed a three-year contract with the Senators.

On June 20, the day of the 2008 NHL Entry Draft, the Senators placed Ray Emery on waivers and re-signed Chris Kelly to a new four-year, $8.5 million contract. At the draft, the Senators selected Erik Karlsson with their first-round pick (15th overall) and proceeded to select Patrick Wiercioch (42nd overall), Zack Smith (79th overall), Andre Petersson (109th overall), Derek Grant (119th overall), Mark Borowiecki (139th overall) and Emil Sandin (199th overall).

On July 1, the Senators announced that they had signed goaltender Alex Auld to a two-year contract worth $1 million annually. Auld is expected to serve as a backup to Martin Gerber for the 2008–09 season. On July 2, the Senators announced that they had re-signed forward Shean Donovan to a two-year contract at $625,000 per season. The Sens also announced that they have signed forward Jarkko Ruutu to a three-year contract worth $1.3 million per season. On July 5, the Ottawa Senators announced that Antoine Vermette had elected to take the club to salary arbitration. The Senators and Vermette agreed to a two-year deal on July 31. On July 8, the Senators announced that they had signed defenceman Jason Smith to a two-year, $5.2 million contract. On July 16, the Senators announced that they will host the Detroit Red Wings in their official home-opener on October 11. On July 17, the Ottawa Senators and CHUM Radio announced that the club and The Team 1200 had signed a multi-year extension to their agreement to broadcast Senators' games. The original ten-year contract expired at the end of the 2007–08 season. On July 31, the Ottawa Senators and Antoine Vermette avoided going to arbitration by agreeing to terms on a new two-year contract worth $5.525 million. Vermette would make $2.525 million and $3 million for the 2008–09 and 2009–10 seasons respectively.

On August 29, in a trade similar to the Alexei Yashin trade in 2001, former first-round pick Andrej Meszaros was traded to the Tampa Bay Lightning in exchange for Filip Kuba, Alexandre Picard and a first-round pick in the 2009 NHL Entry Draft (obtained by Tampa Bay in an earlier trade with the San Jose Sharks). Meszaros was a restricted free agent demanding $1 million more per season than what the Senators were willing to offer. After Tampa threatened to offer Meszaros an offer sheet with picks as compensation on August 28, the Senators opted to make a trade with Tampa. Meszaros subsequently signed a six-year, $24 million contract on August 30 with the Lightning. On September 2, the Senators made a deal with the Vancouver Canucks and traded defenceman Lawrence Nycholat for centre/right winger Ryan Shannon. On the same day, they signed another former Canucks player, Brad Isbister, who was an unrestricted free agent. On September 27, veteran defenseman Luke Richardson re-signed on a one-year, two-way contract with the Senators for his second season with the club.

Pre-season
On October 2, the Senators played their first-ever game in Europe, a pre-season exhibition game in Gothenburg, Sweden, against Frolunda HC, which Ottawa captain Daniel Alfredsson played for before joining the NHL and during the 2004–05 NHL lockout. The Senators finished the 2008 pre-season with a record of 4–2–0–0.

|-
| September 20
| 7:00 pm
| New York Rangers
| Scotiabank Place
| W, 3–2
|-
| September 22
| 7:00 pm
| New York Rangers
| Madison Square Garden
| L, 2–1
|-
| September 24
| 7:00 pm
| Philadelphia Flyers
| Scotiabank Place
| W, 3–1
|-
| September 26
| 7:30 pm
| Montreal Canadiens
| Bell Centre
| L, 5–0
|-
| September 27
| 7:00 pm
| Montreal Canadiens
| Scotiabank Place
| W, 3–1
|-
| October 2
| 1:00 pm
| Frölunda HC
| Scandinavium Arena
| W, 4–1
|-

Regular season
The Senators started their season with a pair of games in Stockholm, Sweden. The Senators played the Pittsburgh Penguins twice at the Scandinavium on October 4 and October 5. The teams split the results, with the Penguins winning the first in overtime and the Senators winning the second. New Senator defenceman Filip Kuba picked up at least one point in each of the Senators' first eight games of the season, setting the NHL record for consecutive team games with assists from the start of a season by a defenceman. The previous mark of seven was set by Brad Park with the Boston Bruins in 1981–82. All points were assists and Kuba did not score his first goal with the Senators until November 13.

Alexander Nikulin, who had been demoted to the American Hockey League (AHL)'s Binghamton Senators, threatened to return to Russia unless he was traded. As a result, he was traded from Binghamton to the Phoenix Coyotes' AHL affiliate, the San Antonio Rampage, for Drew Fata.

For a game on November 22 against the New York Rangers, the Senators unveiled their new third jersey. Marketed as "Back in Black," the jersey is primarily black. The Senators' primary logo moves to the shoulders and the nickname "SENS" is across the front of the jersey.

Prior to that game, the Senators players, the team below the playoff cutoff in the standings for most of October through November, decided to grow moustaches, similar to the playoff beard tradition of teams in the playoffs. The team started growing the moustaches following a loss to the Montreal Canadiens on November 20. The idea originated with Dany Heatley.

On November 27, the Senators waived Luke Richardson, a veteran of nearly 20 years in the NHL. He was not picked up by any other team and subsequently retired. He had not seen much playing time with Senators, and had been a healthy scratch several times in the season.

From December until early January, the Senators took an eight-game road trip as Scotiabank Place was used for the 2009 World Junior Ice Hockey Championships. The team, already well back of a playoff spot, received intense scrutiny by the media, believing a "shake-up" of some kind was imminent. The team only won one game on the road trip, and on January 7, Owner Eugene Melnyk was compelled to respond to media reports of the imminent firings of General Manager Bryan Murray and Head Coach Craig Hartsburg:
“Contrary to what is being reported today by the media, I have made no decisions with respect to any personnel changes within the Senators organization. Winning remains our No. 1 priority and there is a collective focus by our management, our coaching staff and our players to deliver this to our fans.

I, along with our fans, will do nothing but continue to remain fully committed to our Senators and enthusiastically cheer them on to a successful second half of the season.

This is crunch time. Now, more than ever, is the time to rally behind our team. We don’t surrender half-way through the season.

Every victory from here on in matters. We know it and the fans know it. Period.”
At the end of the road trip on January 8, the club was 13 points behind the eighth and final playoff spot, held by the Buffalo Sabres. The Ottawa Citizen launched the "Tavares Cup," similar in spirit to the "Daigle Cup" of 1993, to keep track of the bottom five teams in the NHL, all of which had a chance, at least via the draft lottery, to draft the highly rated junior player, John Tavares. At the time of the start of the "competition," the Senators were within the lowest five teams in the League.

Also on January 7, forward Jarkko Ruutu received a suspension of two games for biting in an altercation with a Buffalo Sabres forward on January 6. It was Ruutu's second suspension of the season, after elbowing a Montreal Canadiens forward earlier in the season.

On January 9, 2009, goaltender Brian Elliott was recalled by Ottawa from Binghamton. He had been named the AHL's Goaltender of the Month for December. On January 15, Senators goaltender Martin Gerber was demoted to Binghamton for a two-week conditioning stint; he was placed on waivers and was assigned to Binghamton on January 27. Elliott started six games in a row and remained with Ottawa.

On January 29, less than a month after previous comments to the media about the Senators, Eugene Melnyk responded to media speculation about possible organization changes with another memorable quote:

“Anybody that says we should blow up this organization should get their own bomb and go blow themselves up.”

At the time, the Senators remained near the bottom of the League in 29th place, with the lowest goal-scoring record in the NHL.

However, only three days later, on February 2, Head Coach Craig Hartsburg was fired, ending his tenure with the Senators at only 48 games. Following a 7–4 loss to the Washington Capitals on February 1, Hartsburg had called out his team for not playing hard. Binghamton Senators' Head Coach Cory Clouston was elevated to head coach of Ottawa for the balance of the season. Clouston became the fourth head coach to coach the Senators in a year, prompting the media to dub the players as "coach-killers." Assistant Coach Curtis Hunt was also let go (he became the Binghamton head coach) and recently retired defenceman Luke Richardson joined the coaching staff as an assistant.

On February 12, former Head Coach John Paddock (who had moved on to coach the AHL' Philadelphia Phantoms) weighed in on the firing, stating that at some point that GM Bryan Murray would be held accountable:
“I think now he's next in line. We were 14 games over .500 when I was fired. They're seven under now. Somebody needs to take responsibility for that. Whether the coaches he hired and fired were good or not, they're his players and they're either not playing good or can't play, one or the other.” He was then asked which was the case: “The players are not very good, that's the problem.”

Paddock apologized to Murray via e-mail. Murray commented, "I'm disappointed and a little bit surprised by it. I'm not sure what purpose he was trying to achieve doing that. He sent me an apology. The only complaint I ever had with John was that I didn't think he worked hard enough at getting himself ready and getting the team ready to play games."

Late in February and early in March, as the season neared the trade deadline, the team still held out hold of making the playoffs although the team remained over ten points out of a playoff spot, as the team was winning more often with Clouston. The Senators began making roster deals, sending Dean McAmmond and a 2009 first-round pick for Chris Campoli and Mike Comrie. By the NHL trade deadline day of March 4, Murray admitted to the media that the club would be "sellers" and had given up hope of making the playoffs. On March 4, Antoine Vermette was traded to the Columbus Blue Jackets for goaltender Pascal Leclaire and a draft pick. Martin Gerber was put on waivers three times and was finally picked up by the Toronto Maple Leafs.

Although the club improved its record under new coach Clouston, including a 10–5–0 record in March, it was not enough to salvage the season. On March 31, following a loss to the Florida Panthers and a win by the Montreal Canadiens, the club was officially eliminated from playoff contention for the first time since 1996.

Although eliminated, the team continued to play well, including a nine-game win streak on home ice. By April 8, the team's record under Clouston was 19–10–3 and he was rewarded with a two-year deal to continue coaching the Senators.

Divisional standings

Conference standings

|-bgcolor="white"
| 1†S || OTL || Sat October 4 || 3–4 || Pittsburgh Penguins || 13,699 ||  || 0–0–1 || 1
|-bgcolor="#CCFFCC"
| 2S || W || Sun October 5 || 3–1 || @ Pittsburgh Penguins  || 13,699 ||  || 1–0–1 || 3
|-bgcolor="ffcccc"
| 3 || L || Sat October 11 || 2–3 || Detroit Red Wings  || 20,182 ||  || 1–1–1 || 3
|-bgcolor="#CCFFCC"
| 4 || W || Fri October 17 || 6–3 ||Phoenix Coyotes  || 20,179 ||  || 2–1–1 || 5
|-bgcolor="ffcccc"
| 5 || L || Sat October 18 || 2–4 || Boston Bruins || 19,318 ||  || 2–2–1 || 5
|-bgcolor="ffcccc"
| 6 ||L|| Wed October 22 || 1–3 || Florida Panthers || 19,952 ||  || 2–3–1 || 5
|-bgcolor="ffcccc"
| 7 ||L|| Fri October 24 || 3–4 || Anaheim Ducks || 19,762 ||  || 2–4–1 || 5
|-bgcolor="ffcccc"
| 8 ||L|| Sat October 25 || 2–3 || @ Toronto Maple Leafs || 19,232 ||  || 2–5–1 || 5
|-bgcolor="#CCFFCC"
| 9 ||W|| Mon October 27 || 5–2 || @ Buffalo Sabres || 18,690 ||  || 3–5–1 || 7
|-bgcolor="#CCFFCC"
| 10 ||W|| Thu October 30 || 2–1  || @ Florida Panthers || 13,567 ||  || 4–5–1 || 9
|-

|-
| 11 || November 1 || Tampa Bay Lightning || 3–2 (SO)|| Tampa || 16,104 || 4–5–2 || 10 || 
|-bgcolor="#CCFFCC"
| 12 || November 4 || Washington Capitals || 2–1 (W)|| Scotiabank Place || 18,485 || 5–5–2 || 12 || 
|-bgcolor="#CCFFCC"
| 13 || November 6 || Philadelphia Flyers || 4–1 (W) || Scotiabank Place || 18,938 || 6–5–2 || 14 || 
|-bgcolor="ffcccc"
| 14 || November 7 || Carolina Hurricanes || 2–1 (L) || Raleigh || 15,206 || 6–6–2 || 14 || 
|-bgcolor="ffcccc"
| 15 || November 11 || Montreal Canadiens || 4–0 (L) || Montreal || 21,273 || 6–7–2 || 14 || 
|-bgcolor="ffcccc"
| 16 || November 13 || New York Islanders || 3–1 (L) || Scotiabank Place || 19,061 || 6–8–2 || 14 || 
|-bgcolor="ffcccc"
| 17 || November 15 || New York Islanders || 3–2 (L) || New York || 13,722 || 6–9–2 || 14 || 
|-
| 18 || November 17 ||  New York Rangers || 2–1 (SO) || New York || 18,200 || 6–9–3 || 15 || 
|-
| 19 || November 20 || Montreal Canadiens || 3–2 (SO) || Scotiabank Place || 20,475 || 6–9–4 || 16 || 
|-bgcolor="#CCFFCC"
| 20 || November 22 || New York Rangers || 4–1 (W) || Scotiabank Place || 19,619 || 7–9–4 || 18 || 
|-bgcolor="#CCFFCC"
| 21 || November 27 || Toronto Maple Leafs || 2–1 (W) || Scotiabank Place || 19,703 || 8–9–4 || 20 || 
|-bgcolor="ffcccc"
| 22 || November 29 || New York Islanders || 4–2 (L) || New York || 13,108 || 8–10–4 || 20 || 
|-

|-bgcolor="#CCFFCC"
| 23 || December 3 || Atlanta Thrashers || 5–1 (W) || Scotiabank Place  || 17,215 || 9–10–4 || 22 || 
|-bgcolor="#CCFFCC"
| 24 || December 6 || Pittsburgh Penguins || 3–2 (W) || Scotiabank Place || 19,561 || 10–10–4 || 24 || 
|-
| 25 || December 8 || Florida Panthers || 4–3 (OT) || Scotiabank Place || 17,947 || 10–10–5 || 25 || 
|-bgcolor="ffcccc"
| 26 || December 10 || Chicago Blackhawks || 2–0 (L) || Chicago || 21,614 || 10–11–5 || 25 || 
|-bgcolor="ffcccc"
| 27 || December 12 || Washington Capitals || 5–1 (L) || Washington || 17,973 || 10–12–5 || 25 || 
|-bgcolor="#CCFFCC"
| 28 || December 13 || Tampa Bay Lightning || 2–0 (W) || Scotiabank Place || 18,446 || 11–12–5 || 27 || 
|-bgcolor="ffcccc"
| 29 || December 16 || Atlanta Thrashers || 4–1 (L)|| Scotiabank Place  || 18,746 || 11–13–5 || 27 || 
|-bgcolor="ffcccc"
| 30 || December 19 || New Jersey Devils || 5–1 (L) || Newark || 13,242 || 11–14–5 || 27 || 
|-bgcolor="#CCFFCC"
| 31 || December 20 || Dallas Stars || 5–4 (W) || Scotiabank Place || 19,486 || 12–14–5 || 29 || 
|-bgcolor="#FFBBBB"
| 32 || December 23 || Philadelphia Flyers || 6–4 (L) || Philadelphia || 19,578 || 12–15–5 || 29 || 
|-bgcolor="#FFBBBB"
| 33 || December 27 || Calgary Flames || 6–3 (L) || Calgary || 19,289|| 12–16–5|| 29 || 
|-bgcolor="#FFBBBB"
| 34 || December 28 || Vancouver Canucks || 3–0 (L) || Vancouver || 18,630 || 12–17–5 || 29 || 
|-bgcolor="#CCFFCC"
| 35 || December 30 || Edmonton Oilers || 3–2 (W) || Edmonton || 16,839 || 13–17–5 || 31 || 
|-

|-bgcolor="#FFBBBB"
| 36 || January 3 || Toronto Maple Leafs || 3–1 (L) || Toronto || 19,406 || 13–18–5 || 31|| 
|-bgcolor="white"
| 37 || January 4 || New Jersey Devils || 4–3 (OT)|| Newark || 14,798 || 13–18–6 || 32 || 
|-bgcolor="#FFBBBB"
| 38 || January 6 || Buffalo Sabres || 4–2 (L)|| Buffalo || 18,690 || 13–19–6 || 32 || 
|-bgcolor="#FFBBBB"
| 39 || January 8 || Boston Bruins || 6–4 (L)|| Boston || 16,464 || 13–20–6 || 32 || 
|-bgcolor="#FFBBBB"
| 40 || January 10 || New York Rangers || 2–0(L) || Scotiabank Place || 19,029 ||13–21–6 || 32 || 
|-bgcolor="#CCFFCC"
| 41 || January 13 || Carolina Hurricanes || 5–1(W) || Scotiabank Place|| 18,512 || 14–21–6 || 34 || 
|-bgcolor="#CCFFCC"
| 42 || January 14 || Atlanta Thrashers || 3–2(W) || Atlanta || 14,163 || 15–21–6 || 36 || 
|-
| 43 || January 17 || Montreal Canadiens || 4–5(SO) || Scotiabank Place|| 20,413 || 15–21–7 || 37 || 
|- bgcolor="#CCFFCC"
| 44 || January 20 || Washington Capitals || 3–2(W) || Scotiabank Place|| 20,125 ||  16–21–7 || 39 || 
|- bgcolor="#FFBBBB"
| 45 || January 27 || New Jersey Devils || 4–1(L)|| Scotiabank Place|| 18,786 ||16–22–7 || 39 || 
|- bgcolor="#CCFFCC"
| 46 || January 29 || St. Louis Blues || 3–1(W) || St. Louis || 18,639 || 17–22–7 || 41 || 
|- bgcolor="#FFBBBB"
| 47 || January 30 || Columbus Blue Jackets || 1–0(L) || Columbus || 17,080 || 17–23–7 ||  41 || 
|-

|- bgcolor="#FFBBBB"
| 48 || February 1 || Washington Capitals || 7–4(L) || Washington || 18,277 || 17–24–7 || 41 || 
|-  bgcolor="#FFBBBB"
| 49 || February 3 || Los Angeles Kings || 1–0(L) || Scotiabank Place || 18,054 || 17–25–7 || 41 || 
|-
| 50 || February 5 || Boston Bruins || 4–3(L-SO) || Scotiabank Place|| 17,297 || 17–25–8 || 42 || 
|-  bgcolor="#CCFFCC"
| 51 || February 7 || Buffalo Sabres || 3–2(W-SO)|| Scotiabank Place|| 18,452 || 18–25–8 || 44 || 
|- bgcolor="#CCFFCC"
| 52 || February 11 || Buffalo Sabres || 3–1(W) || Buffalo || 18,690 || 19–25–8 || 46 || 
|- bgcolor="#CCFFCC"
| 53 || February 12 || Philadelphia Flyers || 5–2(W)|| Philadelphia || 19,679 || 20–25–8 || 48 || 
|- bgcolor="#CCFFCC"
| 54 || February 14 || Minnesota Wild || 5–3(W) || Minnesota ||18,568 || 21–25–8|| 50 || 
|- bgcolor="#CCFFCC"
| 55 || February 16 || Nashville Predators || 2–0(W) || Nashville || 14,681 || 22–25–8 || 52 || 
|-
| 56 || February 17 || Colorado Avalanche || 3–2(L-OT) || Denver || 15,237 || 22–25–9 || 53 || 
|- bgcolor="#FFBBBB"
| 57 || February 19 || Vancouver Canucks || 5–2(L) || Scotiabank Place|| 19,716 || 22–26–9 || 53 || 
|- bgcolor="#FFBBBB"
| 58 || February 21 || Montreal Canadiens || 5–3(L)|| Montreal || 21,723 || 22–27–9 || 53 || 
|- bgcolor="#CCFFCC"
| 59 || February 24 || Carolina Hurricanes || 4–2(W) || Scotiabank Place|| 16,541 || 23–27–9 || 55 || 
|- bgcolor="#FFBBBB"
| 60 || February 26 || San Jose Sharks || 2–1(L) || Scotiabank Place|| 17,791 || 23–28–9 || 55 || 
|-
| 61 || February 28 || Toronto Maple Leafs || 4–3(L-OT) || Scotiabank Place|| 20,050 || 23–28–10 || 56 || 
|-

|- bgcolor="#FFBBBB"
| 62 || March 3 || Calgary Flames || 6–3(L) || Scotiabank Place || 18,865|| 23–29–10 || 56 || 
|- bgcolor="#CCFFCC"
| 63 || March 5 || Edmonton Oilers || 4–2(W) || Scotiabank Place || 17,904 || 24–29–10 || 58 || 
|- bgcolor="#CCFFCC"
| 64 || March 7 || Buffalo Sabres || 6–3(W)|| Scotiabank Place|| 18,444 || 25–29–10 || 60 || 
|- bgcolor="#CCFFCC"
| 65 || March 9 || Toronto Maple Leafs || 2–1(W) || Scotiabank Place|| 18,898 || 26–29–10 || 62 || 
|- bgcolor="#CCFFCC"
| 66 || March 11 || Tampa Bay Lightning || 3–2(W-OT) || Scotiabank Place|| 19,231 || 27–29–10 || 64 || 
|- bgcolor="#FFBBBB"
| 67 || March 12 || Boston Bruins || 5–3(L) || Boston || 17,022 || 27–30–10 || 64 || 
|- bgcolor="#CCFFCC"
| 68 || March 14 || Pittsburgh Penguins || 4–3(W-SO) || Pittsburgh || 17,132 || 28–30–10 || 66 || 
|-  bgcolor="#CCFFCC"
| 69 || March 17 || Buffalo Sabres || 4–2(W) || Scotiabank Place|| 20,053 || 29–30–10 || 68 || 
|- bgcolor="#CCFFCC"
| 70 || March 19 || Montreal Canadiens || 5–4(W) || Scotiabank Place || 20,500 || 30–30–10 || 70 || 
|- bgcolor="#CCFFCC"
| 71 || March 21 || New York Islanders || 5–2(W) || Scotiabank Place|| 19,751 || 31–30–10|| 72 ||  
|- bgcolor="#CCFFCC"
| 72 || March 22 || New York Rangers || 2–1(W) || New York || 18,200 || 32–30–10 || 74 || 
|- bgcolor="#FFBBBB"
| 73 || March 25 || Carolina Hurricanes || 2–1(L) || Carolina || 17,146 || 32–31–10 || 74 || 
|- bgcolor="#FFBBBB"
| 74 || March 28 || Atlanta Thrashers || 6–3(L) || Atlanta || 17,053 || 32–32–10 || 74 || 
|- bgcolor="#CCFFCC"
| 75 || March 29 || Tampa Bay Lightning || 3–0(W) || Tampa Bay || 16,427 || 33–32–10 || 76 || 
|- bgcolor="#FFBBBB"
| 76 || March 31 || Florida Panthers || 5–2(L) || Florida || 15,247 || 33–33–10 || 76 || 
|-

|- bgcolor="#FFBBBB"
| 77 || April 2 || Boston Bruins || 2–1(L) || Boston || 17,565 || 33–34–10 || 76 || 
|- bgcolor="#CCFFCC"
| 78 || April 4 || Philadelphia Flyers || 4–3(W-SO) || Scotiabank Place ||19,557 || 34–34–10 || 78 || 
|- bgcolor="#CCFFCC"
| 79 || April 6 || Montreal Canadiens || 3–2(W) || Montreal || 21,273 || 35–34–10 || 80 || 
|- bgcolor="#CCFFCC"
| 80 || April 7 || Boston Bruins || 3–2(W) || Scotiabank Place|| 19,053 || 36–34–10 || 82 || 
|-
| 81 || April 9 || New Jersey Devils ||3-2(L-SO) || Scotiabank Place|| 20,151 || 36–34–11 || 83 || 
|- bgcolor="#FFBBBB"
| 82 || April 11 || Toronto Maple Leafs || 5–2(L)|| Toronto|| 19,370 || 36–35–11 || 83 ||
|-

|-
|Legend:   
|-
| @ Indicates away game. S Played at Scandinavium Arena, Stockholm, SE. † First game in Sweden is considered a "home" game.

Player statistics

Skaters

Goaltenders

#Retired.
†Denotes player spent time with another team before joining Senators. Stats reflect time with Senators only.
‡Traded mid-season.

Playoffs
The Senators attempted to make the playoffs for the 12th straight season. Prior to the season, a majority of predictions by the media placed the Senators to enter the playoffs as the fourth seed or lower. Some, including The Hockey News Adam Proteau, placed the team to miss the playoffs altogether. However, if they make the playoffs, Proteau plans to
“Commission a musical mash-up consisting of Alanis Morissette and Paul Anka music – and Tom Green's short-lived professional rap career – and listen to it on repeat for an entire drive from Toronto to Ottawa. And back, even.”The Hockey News, December 11, 2008

After changing coaches and improving play, the Senators were not able to qualify for the playoffs. On March 31, the Senators were mathematically eliminated from the playoff race.

Awards and records

Records
 NHL record for consecutive team games with assists from the start of a season by a defenseman (8) – Filip Kuba.
 March 5, 2009 – Jason Spezza scored at 0:12 of the first period to set a new Senators record for the fastest goal from the start of a game.
 April 7, 2009 – Team won ninth consecutive home game to set new team record.

Milestones

 ALater demoted to Binghamton and released on waivers, it was also his last game with Ottawa.

Transactions
 May 29, 2008 - re-signed Jesse Winchester
 June 2, 2008 - signed Peter Regin to entry-level contract.
 June 13, 2008 - signed Craig Hartsburg to a three-year contract.
 June 18, 2008 - re-signed Matt Carkner to a two-year contract.
 June 20, 2008 - placed Ray Emery on waivers. (bought out)
 June 20, 2008 - re-signed Chris Kelly
 July 1, 2008 - signed Alex Auld to two-year contract
 July 2, 2008 - re-signed Shean Donovan
 July 2, 2008 - signed Jarkko Ruutu
 July 7, 2008 - re-signed Greg Mauldin to a one-year, two-way contract.
 July 8, 2008 - signed Jason Smith
 July 11, 2008 - signed Mitchell O'Keefe to a one-year, entry-level contract.
 July 11, 2008 - signed Brendan Bell to a one-year, two-way contract.
 July 11, 2008 - signed Curtis Hunt to a three-year contract.
 July 28, 2008 - re-signed Jeff Glass to a one-year, two-way contract.
 July 29, 2008 - re-signed Josh Hennessy to a two-year, two-way contract.
 July 31, 2008 - re-signed Antoine Vermette to a two-year contract.
 August 11, 2008 - re-signed Geoff Waugh to a one-year, two-way contract.
 August 14, 2008 - signed Zack Smith to an entry-level contract.
 September 4, 2008 - signed Brad Isbister to a one-year, two-way contract.
 September 27, 2008 - re-signed Luke Richardson to a one-year, two-way contract.
 September 27, 2008 - assigned Brad Isbister to Binghamton. Isbister declined and was loaned to EV Zug on October 4.
 October 30, 2008 - re-signed Daniel Alfredsson to a four-year contract extension.
 November 27, 2008 - placed Luke Richardson on waivers. (retired)
 January 22, 2009 - placed Martin Gerber on waivers. (assigned to Binghamton)
 February 2, 2009 - fire Craig Hartsburg as head coach, elevate Cory Clouston to head coach.
 March 4, 2009 - re-signed Filip Kuba to three-year contract extension at $3.7 million per season.
 March 9, 2009 - signed free agent Craig Schira to three-year entry-level contract.Source:' senators.nhl.com

Trades

Free agent acquisitions

Players lost to free agency

Waivers

Draft picks
Ottawa's picks at the 2008 NHL Entry Draft in Ottawa, Ontario.

Farm teams
 Binghamton Senators (American Hockey League)
 Elmira Jackals (ECHL)

The Senators continued their affiliation with the Binghamton Senators of the American Hockey League (AHL) and added an affiliation agreement with the Elmira Jackals of the ECHL. In previous years, Elmira had accepted players from Binghamton on a player-by-player basis. The new agreement formalized the arrangement of Elmira as the primary affiliate of Binghamton and the secondary affiliate of Ottawa.

See also
 2008–09 NHL season

References

Ottawa Senators seasons
Ottawa Senators season, 2008-09
Ottawa